The following is an incomplete list of notable spies during World War II.

Spies for France

Spies for Germany

Spies for Italy

Spies for the Netherlands

Spies for Poland

Spies for Russia

Spies for Sweden

Spies for the United Kingdom

Spies for the United States

Those who 'leaked' stories to the media, as opposed to spying for a country

Spies for unknown countries

See also
List of Japanese spies, 1930–45
Commanders of World War II
World War II casualties

References

 
Spies World War II
Spies